Viking is a 2016 Russian historical film about medieval prince Vladimir the Great, Prince of Novgorod directed by Andrei Kravchuk and co-produced by Konstantin Ernst and Anatoliy Maksimov.  
The film stars Danila Kozlovsky, Svetlana Khodchenkova, Maksim Sukhanov, Aleksandra Bortich, Igor Petrenko, Andrey Smolyakov, Kirill Pletnyov, Aleksandr Ustyugov and Joakim Nätterqvist. The movie is inspired by historical accounts such as Primary Chronicle and Icelandic Kings' sagas.

Viking was released in Russia by Central Partnership on December 29, 2016, and the world premiere took place on January 6, 2017. Two versions were released: a 12+ (128 minutes) and a 18+ (133 minutes). With a budget of $20.8 million, Viking was the third most expensive Russian film (after two parts of Burnt by the Sun 2) by the time of its release. The movie was met with mixed reviews by Russian film critics. grossed $32.3 million in box office. It grossed $25 million at the box office in Russia and the Commonwealth of Independent States, becoming the top-grossing Russian film to be released in 2016.

Plot
After the death of his father, Svyatoslav I, ruler of Kievan Rus, the young prince Vladimir  (Danila Kozlovsky) is forced into exile across the frozen sea in Sweden to escape his treacherous half-brother Yaropolk (Aleksandr Ustyugov), who has murdered his other brother Oleg (Kirill Pletnyov) and conquered the territory of Kievan Rus. The old warrior Sveneld (Maksim Sukhanov) convinces Vladimir to assemble a force of Viking mercenaries led by a Swedish chieftain (Joakim Nätterqvist), hoping to reconquer Kiev from Yaropolk.

Cast
 Danila Kozlovsky as Vladimir the Great
 Aleksandr Ustyugov as Yaropolk I of Kiev
 Kirill Pletnyov as Oleg of Drelinia
 Andrey Smolyakov as Rogvolod
 Aleksandra Bortich as Rogneda, princess of Polotsk, wife of Vladimir the Great
 Svetlana Khodchenkova as Irina, the Byzantine Greek wife of Yaropolk I of Kiev 	
 Maksim Sukhanov as Sveneld, voivode of the Grand Duke Sviatoslav Igorevich
 Rostislav Bershauer as Blud, voivode and boyar of Kiev
 Nikolay Kozak as Lyut, the prince of Yaropolk's retinue
 Igor Petrenko as Varyazhko, the prince of Yaropolk's retinue
 Vladimir Epifantsev as Theodore, the prince of Yaropolk's retinue
 Ivan Shmakov as John, Theodore's son (boy in Kiev)
 Pawel Delag as Anastas
 Aleksey Demidov as Samocha
 Aleksandr Lobanov as Putyata
 John DeSantis as Berserk
 Joakim Nätterqvist as Khevding
 Harald Rosenstrøm as Einar
 Aleksandr Armer as Ulvar 
 Oleg Dobrovan as Valgard 
 Ziedonis Lochmelis as Torvald 
 Daniil Soldatov, Vilen Babichev and Oleg Sizov as Viking chieftains

Production

Development
The film was produced by Konstantin Ernst and Anatoly Maksimov, best known for the Russian urban fantasy/supernatural thrillers Night Watch and Day Watch.

A few scenes were filmed in 2013 to secure funding, a common way to secure finances for large movie productions in Russia. Most of the production was done in March–July 2015. The budget was on par with the Russian WWII epic Stalingrad, 1,250 million rubles (approximately US$20 million).

The main historical consultants of the film were the historian and archaeologist Vladimir Petrukhin and the linguist Fyodor Uspenskiy.

The costume designer traveled to several cities and countries, buying fabric and studying frescoes and museum in China, India, Helsinki, Riga, Novgorod, Stockholm,  and Minsk.

The Pecheneg language, an extinct Turkic language once spoken in Eastern Europe (in what today is most of Ukraine, parts of southern Russia, Moldova, and Hungary) in the 7th–12th centuries, was "re-invented" for the movie.

Casting
The cast is mostly Russian; however the film does features Swedish actor Joakim Nätterqvist, Canada's John DeSantis and Belarusian actress Aleksandra Bortich.

Nätterqvist told Sweden's TV4 that on set he worked with a translator, a Norwegian actor who has lived (and educated) in Russia. Most of his dialog is in a very stripped-down amalgam of Swedish and Norwegian, to simulate old Norse.

Members of Kazakhstan’s famous Nomad Stunts were responsible for the battle scenes, including the pyrotechnics, explosions and rigging.

Filming locations
Principal photography began in March 2015.
The film was shot on several locations in the Russia-annexed territory of Crimea, including the city of Bakhchisarai, Bakhchysarai Raion, Crimea.
In the Taigan Water Reservoir, the town of Bilohirsk, Bilohirsk Raion, Crimea.
In the medieval Genoese fortress, the town of Sudak, Crimea.
In the village of Shkolnoe, Simferopol Raion, Crimea.
In the zakaznik of Cape Fiolent near Sevastopol. Also, the shooting took place at the Glavkino studio.

Later, the scenery of the film was used in the construction of the Viking Cinema Park in the village of Perevalne, Simferopol Raion, Crimea. The construction of the facility began in October 2015 on the left bank of the Kizilkobinka mountain river at the beginning of the ascent to the Red Caves. Cinema Park opened in May 2016

As it was partially filmed in the Russia-annexed territory of Crimea, this film was banned in some countries.

Some scenes were filmed in Ravenna, Italy in mid-August 2015. The shooting took place in Basilica of San Vitale and the Mausoleum of Galla Placidia. This Basilica an important example of early Byzantine architecture in Europe and was used for scenes set in Chersonesus.

Versions
The film was released in two versions, one family friendly version with an age restriction of 12+, and a complete version, with a rating of 18+. According to Radio P4 Stockholm, the  movie was also planned eventually to be released as a TV-series, featuring hours of footage that did not make it into the cinematic release.

Music
The author of the music for the film is the Russian composer and producer Igor Matvienko. The soundtrack was created for two years. Previously, the composer studied music of 9-10 centuries, got acquainted with the era of Prince Vladimir. The Specialists from the Gnessin State Musical College were involved in the recording, copies of ancient instruments of that time (hurdy-gurdy, gudok, tambourines, gusli) were ordered. Tracks were recorded on these instruments, then the phonograms were mixed with a synthesizer. A special studio was equipped to record music. The producer Igor Polonsky, arrangers Artyom Vasiliev, Alexander Kamensky, Rafael Safin, the soloist of the Gorod 312 group Aya and many others took part in the work.

The film's trailers (and part of the movie) was scored by Irish composer Dean Valentine. Valentine's music was recorded with the Orchestra Of Ireland. Valentine is best known for his original music for trailers including Captain America: Civil War, Interstellar and American Sniper, but he has also scored Irish documentaries and motion pictures such as Tiger Raid, and Close to Evil.

Release
UK based Red Arrow International will sell the movie internationally. A screening for potential buyers was arranged at the 2016 American Film Market. They received 200 inquiries from 45 territories to buy the movie. The Russian News Agency reported on January 19, 2017 that ‘Viking’ had been sold to more than 60 countries, including Germany, Spain, Belgium, Switzerland, China, South Korea, United Kingdom, Italy, and most of Latin America, even though it was partially filmed in a Russian-annexed territory of Crimea (mostly recognized as a part of Ukraine).

Viking was released in China on 10,000 screens under a deal closed between Central Partnership and Chinese distributors Flame Node Entertainment and Beijing United Film Artists Co.

The film was released in Germany on DVD and Amazon Prime Video (SVOD service) on April 29. It will have its Swiss premier at the Neuchatel International Fantastic Film Festival on July 4.

Viking was released in the United Kingdom on September 18, 2017, and in France on 10 October 2017, at the Absurde Seance festival.

In total, this film has been sold to over 80 territories, becoming one of Russia's biggest international sellers in 2017.

The movie was released in the US via Amazon Prime Video in October 2018.

Marketing
The first official teaser trailer was shown during a closed pitch event with the management of the Russian Ministry of Culture and chairmen of Cinema Foundation of Russia.

In September 2015, Central Partnership distribution studios announced the release date for the film as 22 December 2016. On 19 November 2015, Film Direction and Channel One Russia released the official trailer to the public.

The film was presented on October 1, 2016, as part of Comic-Con Russia 2016, and a large sword fight was performed by the films' stuntmen, replicating a fight scene from the movie.
Exclusive materials specially prepared for the convention were shown, including a "live" trailer - stunt show at the stand, which was built in the form of an old Russian outpost. Visitors to the event could participate in competitions on knowledge of Russian history, try on costumes of the characters of the film and take pictures with props.

The set and the scenery used in the production were used to create Russia's first movie-based theme park, which opened in May of 2016 near the village of Perevalnoye, Crimea.

Reception
Despite the overwhelming marketing and advertisement campaign, the film received low reviews in the Russian press.Критиканство. Рецензии на фильм Викинг (2016), отзывы Many critics in magazines like Afisha, Time Out Russia  and GQ Russia praised the movie's visuals, but derided the story and the biased portrayal of medieval Russians. The public criticised the film for strong Christian propaganda and significant derailment from historical facts, as well as bad camerawork and rather low production quality despite an enormous budget.

Box office
The film has grossed 1.48 billion rubles in Russia and was the tenth highest-grossing film in the country in 2016. The film grossed 398 million rubles ($6.7 million) across four territories in the Jan. 5-8 weekend, which earned it a place in the top 10 movies of the international box office.

In Russia, rental was started on December 29, 2016. The total box office grossing of the painting in Russia and the CIS amounted to 1,534,409,689 RUB, in other countries - less than 400,000 US dollars. According to film critic Victor Matizen, this means a box-office failure of the film, since cinemas leave half of the fees to themselves, and the remaining amount does not cover the budget of the film.

See also
 Furious (2017 film), or Legend of Kolovrat'', a Russian historical fantasy action film
 Cinema of Russia

References

External links
 Official website 
 
 

2016 films
2010s Russian-language films
2016 action drama films
2016 biographical drama films
2010s historical action films
2016 war drama films
Films about Christianity
Films about violence
Russian epic films
Biographical films about Russian royalty
Cultural depictions of Vladimir the Great
Films directed by Andrei Kravchuk
Films set in the 10th century
Films set in the 11th century
Kievan Rus in fiction
Russian biographical drama films
Russian historical action films
Russian action drama films
2010s action war films
Russian war drama films
Biographical action films
Films set in Russia
Films set in Belarus
Films set in Ukraine
Films set in the Byzantine Empire
Films based on European myths and legends
Films set in the Viking Age
Historical epic films
Works based on sagas
War epic films
Films shot in Crimea
Films shot in Russia
Fratricide in fiction
Films about Orthodoxy